Mingzhu railway station is an elevated station of the Guangzhou–Zhuhai intercity railway (Guangzhu MRT). It is located in New Xiangzhou, Xiangzhou, Zhuhai, Guangdong, China.

The station is currently entered service along with the other stations in the Zhuhai section of the Guangzhu MRT when that section opened in 2012.

References

Railway stations in Guangdong
Railway stations in China opened in 2012
Zhuhai